Akbarabad (also Romanized as Akbarābād; also known as Akbarābād-e Kavār and Akbar Abad Kawar) is a village in Kavar Rural District, in the Central District of Kavar County, Fars Province, Iran. At the 2006 census, its population was 5,837, in 1,222 families.

References 

Populated places in Kavar County